Nalchity is a town in Jhalokati District in the division of Barisal, Bangladesh. It is the administrative headquarter and urban centre of Nalchity Upazila.

References

Populated places in Jhalokati District
Towns in Bangladesh